Ophisma minna is a moth of the family Noctuidae first described by Achille Guenée in 1852. It is found in South America, including Costa Rica and French Guiana.

References

External links
Image at Hétérocères de Guyane Française. - via Internet Archive.
"Ophisma minna Guenée, 1852". Tropische Schmetterlinge. - via Internet Archive.

Ophiusina